is a Japanese scientist. He is a senior researcher at Sony Computer Science Laboratories and a visiting professor at the Tokyo Institute of Technology. According to the profile posted at his personal blog, his mission is "to solve the so-called mind-brain problem."

After graduating from the University of Tokyo in 1985 with a degree in science and in 1987 with a degree in law, Mogi received in 1992 a Ph.D. with the thesis "Mathematical Model of Muscle Contraction".

Ken Mogi was Japan's first TED speaker. He presented in 2012 March.

Mogi has published over 50 books, most of which are written in Japanese. They cover not only brain science but also includes, but not limited to, philosophy, history, art, education, and linguistics. His books have been frequently used as a source of university entrance examinations. His book  has received 2005 Hideo Kobayashi award, and another book  has received 2008 Takeo Kuwabara academic award.

In 2009, Mogi was charged with violation of tax laws by the National Tax Agency. Mogi failed to file a tax return for his income 400 million yen (US$5.2 million) over 3 years.

In 2018, Mogi published his first book in English titled "Ikigai".

References 
 
The original article was written based on the corresponding Japanese Wikipedia article, retrieved on 2008-04-26.

External links 

The Qualia Manifesto webpage
Qualia Journal - personal blog
Research - Research webpage
Can The brain describe the hearts? (脳は心を記述できるのか) - Mogi is not Scientist.
Ken Mogi's evaded rax(『アハ体験』脳科学者・茂木氏「アハ脱税」で追徴1億6000万円！) - Ken Mogi's evaded tax
His opinion for Fuji TV Climes  -> Claim for Fuji TV  fabrication raicism -  Ken Mogi's criticism of stealth marketing by Fuji Television  was called racism using his two Twitter accounts.
Mogi's cheats - Way of Ken Mogi and Ikeda Daisaku's cheats(茂木・池田騙しの手口) by Yoshihiko Ohtsuki

1962 births
Living people
Riken personnel
University of Tokyo alumni